John Kermit Davis Jr. (born December 14, 1959) is an American college basketball coach who was most recently the head coach for the Ole Miss Rebels from 2018 to 2023. Prior to that, he was the head coach at Middle Tennessee for 16 seasons. His head coaching experience also includes brief stops at Idaho (twice) and Texas A&M.

Early life and family
Davis's father, Kermit Sr., was the head coach at Mississippi State University for seven seasons, ending in 1977. He was an alumnus of the school and was promoted to head coach at age 34 after four years as an assistant for the Bulldogs. In his first season in 1971, he was named SEC Coach of the Year.

The younger Davis graduated from Starkville High School in 1978 and then played at Phillips County Community College in Arkansas for two years, and transferred to hometown Mississippi State, where he played two seasons and earned a bachelor's degree in 1982 and a master's in 1984 while a graduate assistant.

He and his wife, Betty, have two daughters, Ally and Claire. Daughter Claire is an Oakland High School (Tennessee) graduate and business major at Mississippi State University. On June 10, 2017, Claire married Fletcher Johnson. Fletcher is a Tupelo High School graduate and the 2010 State Amateur Golf Champion. Fletcher, like his wife, attended Mississippi State University where he majored in Finance and played for the Mississippi State Bulldogs on the golf team.

Coaching career
When promoted from assistant to head coach at Idaho in 1988 at age 28, Davis was the youngest head coach in NCAA Division I. He had been an assistant for two seasons with the Vandals under new and first-time head coach Tim Floyd, who left for New Orleans. Floyd had rejuvenated the program and under Davis, Idaho had consecutive 25–6 seasons in 1989 and 1990, winning the Big Sky regular season and tournament titles to make the NCAA tournament both years. Davis left the Palouse for Texas A&M of the Southwest Conference in March 1990, but resigned a year later after an 8–21 first season in which he committed rules violations that landed A&M on two years probation and resulted in a two-year show-cause order against Davis himself. After three years at Chipola Junior College and two seasons as an assistant at Utah State, Davis returned to Idaho as head coach in March 1996, then left a year later to become associate head coach under John Brady at LSU.

Davis became head coach at Middle Tennessee in 2002. He led winning records in his first four seasons but first made a postseason tournament in 2010 at the CollegeInsider.com Tournament. Middle Tennessee followed that with appearances in the 2012 NIT and 2013 NCAA tournament. Middle Tennessee moved from the Sun Belt Conference to Conference USA for the 2013–14 season. Following an appearance in the 2015 CollegeInsider.com Tournament, Middle Tennessee made the 2016 NCAA tournament by way of winning the C-USA tournament. In the first round of the NCAA Tournament as a #15 seed, Middle Tennessee upset #2 seed (and AP-ranked #2) Michigan State 90–81. Middle Tennessee then lost the second-round game to #10 seed Syracuse 75–50. The following season Middle Tennessee made it to the second round a second consecutive year by upsetting  #5 seed Minnesota, but again losing in the second round, this time to #4 seed (and AP-ranked #21) Butler.

At the conclusion of the 2017–18 season, Davis was named the head coach at Ole Miss.   Davis led the Rebels to the NCAA Tournament in his first season, where they lost to Oklahoma in the first round.

On February 24, 2023, the University of Mississippi had announced that it and Davis had "mutually agreed to part ways".

Head coaching record

References

External links
 Ole Miss Rebels bio
 Middle Tennessee Blue Raiders bio
 LSU Tigers bio
 Idaho Vandals bio

1959 births
Living people
American men's basketball coaches
American men's basketball players
Basketball coaches from Mississippi
Basketball players from Mississippi
College men's basketball head coaches in the United States
Guards (basketball)
Idaho Vandals men's basketball coaches
Junior college men's basketball coaches in the United States
Junior college men's basketball players in the United States
LSU Tigers basketball coaches
Middle Tennessee Blue Raiders men's basketball coaches
Mississippi State Bulldogs men's basketball coaches
Mississippi State Bulldogs men's basketball players
Ole Miss Rebels men's basketball coaches
People from Leakesville, Mississippi
Starkville High School alumni
Texas A&M Aggies men's basketball coaches
Utah State Aggies men's basketball coaches